F-117 Night Storm is a Sega Mega Drive-exclusive video game that was released in 1993 by Electronic Arts.

Gameplay

The player pilots a Lockheed F-117 Nighthawk. There are two modes: arcade mode and campaign mode. Arcade mode allows players to pick and choose every aspect of the mission, while campaign mode is basically a career in the United States Air Force. From training missions in the deserts of Nevada (during the player's original enlistment period in 1982) to tours of duty in Panama (of the 1980s) and the Gulf War (lasting from 1990 to 1991), each mission has a primary objective that must be completed before moving on.

Players are given the option to equip from seven different weapons; including Sidewinder missiles. Digitized speech is included in this game. During the era of this video game's release, it was considered to be the most realistic combat flight simulator available for the general public. Cinema-like insets are used for dramatic storytelling during cutscenes. Laser targeting is used on the player's aircraft, along with infrared displays of enemy aircraft and other targets.

Reception
Electronic Gaming Monthly gave F-117A Night Storm a score of 5.6 out of 10. They praised the game's concept, cinemas, and level designs, but said the choppiness of the flying and combat was "a fatal flaw".

References

1993 video games
Electronic Arts games
Flight simulation video games
Sega Genesis games
Sega Genesis-only games
Victor Entertainment games
Video games scored by David Whittaker
Video games set in 1982
Video games set in 1989
Video games set in 1990
Video games set in 1991
Video games set in Nevada
Video games set in Panama
Gulf War video games
Video games developed in the United States